Wondrous Journeys is a projection mapping and fireworks show at Disneyland that debuted on January 27, 2023. It premiered alongside World of Color: One as part of the Disney 100 Years of Wonder celebration to commemorate the 100th anniversary of The Walt Disney Company. The show contains a large assortment of songs and characters from Walt Disney Animation Studios films.

History
The show was announced on September 11, 2022 during the D23 Expo. It was developed by Disney Live Entertainment and Walt Disney Animation Studios as part of a collaboration.

Technical details
Wondrous Journeys is a multimedia show that created to celebrating 100 years of Walt Disney Animation Studios and the entire company as a whole. It features a montage of every 61 film released by the studio over the last 100 years which pays tribute to Disney as well as magical moments featuring characters from films, such as Snow White and The Seven Dwarfs, The Little Mermaid, The Princess and the Frog, Frozen, Encanto, the upcoming Wish, and many other films.

The show also features special projection effects showcasing the tribute to Disney animation consisting of blank pieces of paper, pencil sketches, and transitions from black and white to finalized colors as well as featuring characters such as Mickey Mouse, Bambi, Ariel, Mirabel, and Winnie the Pooh.

The show has four viewing areas within the park: Main Street, U.S.A., Sleeping Beauty Castle, It's A Small World, and Rivers of America.

Show summary

A Spark of Inspiration
Gaze in wonder as Sleeping Beauty Castle and Main Street, U.S.A. become a marvelous canvas for 100 years of Walt Disney Animation Studios storytelling. Thrill as talented artists transform empty pages brimming with possibility into beloved Disney characters and vivid animated worlds awash with magic. All of this and more is brought to life by soaring music, stunning state-of-the-art projection technology, and fireworks on select nights.

100 Years in the Making
For over 100 years, Walt Disney Animation Studios has unlocked a special kind of wonder in our lives. These films have inspired to dream bigger, unleash the spirit of adventure, discover the power within—and realize that it’s kind of fun to do the impossible.
Wondrous Journeys is an enchanting celebration of the wishers, dreamers and artists at Walt Disney Animation Studios who have shared their imagination and talents with the world.

Show Scene

Opening

The list below shows complete scenes during the show. Due to differences in projection size, certain scenes are absent from the castle side and the Fantasmic! stage side.

Introduction
At the start of the show, an introduction welcomes guests with the following words:

"For over a hundred years, Walt Disney Animation Studios has invited audiences to believe things never possible. And so tonight, we once again invite you to wish upon a star, to step into the unknown, and to join us on this our Wondrous Journeys."

Shortly afterwards, the music begins with Plio's opening narration from Dinosaur before the show theme It's Wondrous begins:

"Some things start out big, and some things start out small, but sometimes the smallest thing can make the biggest change of all."

During the introduction, the projection on the Fantasmic! stage shows lights with the same colors as Flora, Fauna, and Merryweather, while other buildings just show blue searchlight-like lights.

After that, the original theme song of the show It's Wondrous plays, and features the line drawing and footage from the following shorts and films:
Steamboat Willie (Mickey's footage origin)/Orphan's Benefit (Donald's footage origin)/The Whoopee Party (Goofy's footage origin)
Line drawing from Snow White and the Seven Dwarfs with following support line drawing contents:
Pinocchio/Lady and the Tramp
Encanto/The Princess and the Frog
Tarzan/Peter Pan
Line drawing and concept art from Bambi
The Sorcerer's Apprentice from Fantasia
Tarzan/The Many Adventures of Winnie the Pooh/Pocahontas/The Firebird Suite from Fantasia 2000
Concept arts and animation from The Sorcerer's Apprentice/Aladdin/The Little Mermaid
Concept arts and animation from Snow White and the Seven Dwarfs/Frozen/Cinderella

Act 1
After the introduction that contained the original theme song of the show, There's transition featuring Philadelphia Orchestra's silhouette in Fantasia. In this part, the instrumental version of When You Wish Upon a Star plays, then the first lyric of I'm Wishing sung by Snow White combined with the melody from I'm Wonder from Sleeping Beauty. After that, the reprise of When You Wish Upon A Star was played where for the castle side, it features a flyover of Blue Fairy that accompained by shooting stars of fireworks, while the other buildings, it showed the films instead below:
Tangled
Lilo & Stitch
The Princess and the Frog
Aladdin
Chicken Little
Peter Pan
Cinderella
Wish
Songs of Hope and Yearning
This is a segment that featuring the concept art and the characters sung from three films from Disney Renaissance era as well as Moana from Disney Revival era.
Go the Distance (Hercules)
Belle (Beauty and the Beast)
How Far I'll Go (Moana)
Out There (The Hunchback of Notre Dame)
In Out There segment, all characters from four films were sung together at the finale.

Soundtrack
Wondrous Journeys contains a total of 18 songs. "It's Wondrous", an original song created by Duddy Brown and Alex Geringas, is used as the theme song for the show. The other 17 songs are from various Walt Disney Animation Studios films. 
{| class="wikitable" style="width:30%"
|+ Walt Disney Animation Studios songs in Wondrous Journeys
|-
! Song !! Film
|-
| It's Wondrous || N/A
|-
| I'm Wishing || Snow White and the Seven Dwarfs|-
| I'm Wonder || Sleeping Beauty|-
| When You Wish Upon a Star || Pinocchio|-
| Belle || Beauty and the Beast|-
| Go the Distance || Hercules|-
| How Far I'll Go || Moana|-
| Out There || The Hunchback of Notre Dame|-
| Almost There || The Princess and the Frog|-
| You Can Fly || Peter Pan|-
| For the First Time in Forever || Frozen|-
| Immortal || Big Hero 6|-
| I'll Make a Man Out of You || Mulan|-
| This Land || The Lion King|-
| Poor Unfortunate Souls || The Little Mermaid|-
| Be Prepared || The Lion King|-
| I Am Moana (Song of the Ancestors) || Moana|-
| Dos Oruguitas || Encanto|}

Critical reception

See also
 Disney Enchantment Disney Dreams Happily Ever After''

References

External links
 Official website

Disneyland
Walt Disney Parks and Resorts fireworks